Rimppi Kumari (born ) is an Indian woman farmer who, along with her sister Karamjit, took over a 32-acre farm in Rajasthan after their father died. She is one of the seven Indians who made it on to the BBC list of 100 most aspirational women in 2015. She began to adapt modern farming technologies for cultivation.

References

Living people
Indian women farmers
Women from Rajasthan
BBC 100 Women
1980s births
Indian farmers